This is a list of present and past notable Filipino male actors in stage, film, television, director, news journalist, politician, sports, and many others in alphabetical order by first name.

A

Aaron Agassi (born March 29, 1988)
Aaron Atayde (born March 10, 1986)
Abel Estanislao (born May 9, 1995)
Abra (born December 9, 1990)
Ace Vergel (November 20, 1954–December 15, 2007) (The Original Bad Boy)
Addy Raj (born August 30, 1995)
Adrian Alandy (born February 7, 1980)
Aga Muhlach (born August 12, 1969)
Ahron Villena (born March 10, 1987)
AJ Dee (born July 27, 1982)
AJ Muhlach (born May 20, 1992)
AJ Perez (February 17, 1993–April 17, 2011)
Akihiro Sato (born September 12, 1983)
Al Tantay (born March 15, 1956)
Albert Martinez (born April 19, 1961)
Albie Casiño (born May 14, 1993)
Alden Richards (born January 2, 1992)
Alex de Castro (born September 27, 1985)
Alex Lacson (born January 5, 1965)
Alex Medina (born May 26, 1986)
Alfonso Martinez (born May 19, 1988)
Alfred Vargas (born October 24, 1981)
Aljur Abrenica (born March 24, 1990)
Allan K. (born December 13, 1958)
Allan Paule (born September 17, 1964)
Allen Dizon (unknown born)
Alonzo Muhlach (born February 19, 2010)
Alvin Anson (born October 20, 1962)
Alwyn Uytingco (born February 11, 1988)
Amado Cortez (December 14, 1927–March 22, 2003)
Ambet Nabus (born February 12, 1970)
Andoy Balunbalunan (January 18, 1909–September 8, 1999)
Andre Garcia (born October 23, 1999)
Andre Paras (born November 1, 1995)
Andres Centenera (March 15, 1914–July 7, 1984)
Andrew E. (born July 30, 1967)
Andy Poe (May 14, 1943–September 5, 1995)
Angelo de Castro, Jr. (March 6, 1945–April 5, 2012)
Anjo Damiles (born April 24, 1968)
Anjo Yllana (born April 24, 1968)
Anthony Alonzo (April 2, 1948–October 9, 1998)
Anton dela Paz (born June 6, 1986)
Antonio Aquitania (born January 16, 1977)
Apeng Daldal (October 12, 1928–February 9, 1992)
Apl.de.ap (born November 28, 1974)
April Boy Regino (April 9, 1968-November 29, 2020)
Archie Alemania (born March 6, 1978)
Ariel Rivera (born September 1, 1966)
Ariel Ureta (born November 5, 1946)
Arjo Atayde (born November 5, 1990)
Armando Goyena (December 7, 1922–March 9, 2011)
Arnel Ignacio (born March 14, 1964)
Arnel Pineda (born September 5, 1967)
Arron Villaflor (born July 5, 1990)
Arsenio Bautista (May 9, 1923–September 5, 2019)
Arthur Solinap (born January 19, 1980)
Arturo Tolentino (September 10, 1910–August 2, 2004)
Ate Gay (born August 12, 1971)
Atom Araullo (born October 19, 1982)
Atoy Co (born October 15, 1951)
Aurelio Umali (born January 25, 1966)
Avery Paraiso (born September 22, 1994)
Awra Briguela (born March 26, 2003)

B

Babalu (June 29, 1942–August 27, 1998)
Bailey May (born August 6, 2002)
Balang (born November 7, 2008)
Baldo Marro (January 1, 1948–October 22, 2017)
Balot (March 22, 1926–November 27, 1996)
Bangkay (May 4, 1947–November 6, 2018)
Baron Geisler (born June 5, 1982)
Bassilyo (born December 11, 1977)
Baste (born August 22, 2012)
Bayani Agbayani (born January 3, 1969)
Bayani Casimiro, Jr. (born September 21, 1958)
Bayani Casimiro, Sr. (July 16, 1918–February 27, 1989)
BB Gandanghari (born September 4, 1967)
Bearwin Meily (born April 6, 1976)
Bembol Roco (born November 20, 1953)
Benedict Campos (born January 2, 1989)
Benjamin Alves (born March 31, 1989)
Benjamin Besa (born June 12, 1989)
Benjie Paras (born October 2, 1968)
Bentong (January 12, 1964–February 9, 2019)
Bentot (July 13, 1920–June 19, 1986)
Bernard Bonnin (September 8, 1938–November 21, 2009)
Bernard Palanca (born December 3, 1976)
Bernardo Bernardo (January 28, 1945–March 8, 2018)
Bert "Tawa" Marcelo (October 17, 1936–March 27, 2018)
Berting Labra (April 17, 1933–February 10, 2009)
Betong Sumaya (born November 21, 1972)
Billy Crawford (born May 16, 1982)
Bimby Aquino Yap (born April 19, 2007)
Bing Leonardia (born July 10, 1952)
BJ Forbes (born March 27, 1998)
Blakdyak (July 25, 1969–November 21, 2016)
Bobby Andrews (born November 30, 1976)
Boboy Garovillo (born October 10, 1951)
Bodjie Pascua (born March 2, 1955)
Bomber Moran (October 18, 1944–August 14, 2004)
Bong Revilla (born September 25, 1966)
Boobay (born November 7, 1986)
Boom Labrusca (born August 23, 1974)
Boy Alano (March 20, 1941–July 23, 2022)
Boy Abunda (born October 29, 1955)
Boy Logro (born June 29, 1954)
Brace Arquiza (born December 21, 2000)
Brad Turvey (born March 10, 1978)
Brenan Espartinez (born February 18, 1986)
Brod Pete (born 1958)
Bryan Benedict (born September 27, 1993)
Buboy Villar (born March 21, 1999)
Bugoy Cariño (born September 3, 2002)
Byron Ortile (born August 24, 2004)

C

Cachupoy (July 12, 1932–January 1, 2008)
Carding Castro (July 13, 1935–November 14, 2003)
Carl John Barrameda (born October 12, 1993)
Carl Cervantes (born November 27, 1994)
Carl Guevarra (born September 9, 1988)
Carlo Aquino  (born September 3, 1985)
Carlo Gonzales (born August 14, 1983)
Carlo Lacana (born November 11, 1998)
Carlo Muñoz (born February 24, 1978)
Carlos Agassi (born December 12, 1979)
Carlos Padilla Jr. (born April 19, 1934)
Carlos Padilla Sr. (September 6, 1909–March 8, 1964)
Carlos Salazar (October 26, 1931–April 7, 2022)
Cesar Montano (born August 1, 1962)
César Ramírez (July 9, 1925–July 18, 2003)
Celocia Ismael (October 19, 1750)

Chad Kinis (born April 22, 1986)
Charlie Davao (October 7, 1934–August 8, 2010))
Ching Arellano (June 6, 1960–February 12, 2011)
Chiquito (March 12, 1932–July 2, 1997)
Chito Miranda (born February 7, 1976)
Chokoleit (June 25, 1970–March 9, 2019)
Chris Cayzer (born December 29, 1986)
Chris Gutierrez (born May 9, 1992)
Christian Bables (born December 6, 1992)
Christian Bautista (born October 19, 1981)
Christian Vasquez (born February 7, 1977)
Christopher de Leon (born October 31, 1956)
Chuck Allie (born June 2, 1988)
Chuckie Dreyfus (born August 7, 1974)
CJ Muere (born February 18, 1988)
CJ Navato (born September 13, 1996)
Clarence Delgado (born December 15, 2004)
Coco Martin (born November 1, 1981)
Cogie Domingo (born August 15, 1985)
Conrado Conde (November 25, 1911–March 6, 1992)
Cris Daluz (August 15, 1934–February 12, 2009)
Cris de Vera (March 13, 1924–July 17, 1975)
Cris Villanueva (born May 23, 1971)
CX Navarro (born June 23, 2006)

D

Dagul (born October 5, 1958)
Dale Baldillo (born October 6, 2000)
Dan Alvaro (born October 7, 1957)
Daniel Fernando (born May 12, 1962)
Daniel Matsunaga (born November 28, 1988)
Daniel Padilla (born April 26, 1995)
Danilo Fernandez (born January 14, 1966)
Danny Javier (born August 7, 1946)
Dante Rivero (born August 5, 1946)
Dante Varona (born September 6, 1953)
Dar Bernardo (born April 14, 1992)
Darren Espanto (born May 24, 2001)
Daryl Ong (born March 24, 1987)
Dave Bornea (born February 23, 1995)
David Licauco (born June 15, 1994)
Dencio Padilla (September 2, 1928–October 10, 1997)
Dennis Padilla (born February 9, 1962)
Dennis Trillo (born May 12, 1981)
Dennis Uy (born September 26, 1973)
Derek Ramsay (born December 7, 1976)
Derrick Monasterio (born August 1, 1995)
Dick Israel (December 10, 1947–October 11, 2016)
Diego de Castro III (born November 30, 1975)
Diego Llorico (born July 20, 1971)
Diego Loyzaga (born May 21, 1995)
Diether Ocampo (born July 19, 1974)
Dingdong Avanzado (born July 7, 1968)
Dingdong Dantes (born August 2, 1980)
Dino Imperial (born April 9, 1988)
Diomedes Maturan (August 16, 1940–April 7, 2002)
Dion Ignacio (born March 28, 1986)
DJ Durano (born August 17, 1974)
DM Sevilla (born January 29, 1987)
Dolphy (July 25, 1928–July 10, 2012)
Dominic Ochoa (born August 4, 1974)
Dominic Roco (born April 12, 1989)
Dominic Roque (born July 20, 1990)
Don Pepot (born November 6, 1933–January 18, 2022)
Dong Puno (January 20, 1946–February 15, 2022)
Donny Pangilinan (born February 10, 1998)
Drew Arellano (born January 16, 1980)

E

Eddie Arenas (July 7, 1935–March 31, 2003)
Eddie del Mar (October 13, 1919–November 8, 1986)
Eddie Garcia (May 2, 1929–June 20, 2019)
Eddie Gutierrez (born January 6, 1942)
Eddie Mercado (August 20, 1938–September 18, 2006)
Eddie Mesa (born February 18, 1940)
Eddie Rodriguez (August 23, 1932–October 12, 2001)
Edgar Allan Guzman (born November 20, 1989)
Edgar Mortiz (born August 30, 1954)
Edu Manzano (born September 14, 1955)
Edward Barber (born July 15, 2000)
Edwin San Juan (born February 24, 1969)
Efren "Bata" Reyes (born August 26, 1954)
Efren Reyes Jr. (born June 25, 1957)
Efren Reyes Sr. (June 18, 1924–February 11, 1968)
Ejay Falcon (born November 18, 1989)
Elmo Magalona (born April 27, 1994)
Emman Abeleda (born September 17, 1989)
Emman Nimedez (April 3, 1998–August 16, 2020)
Enchong Dee (born November 5, 1988)
Enrique Gil (born March 30, 1992)
Enzo Pineda (born March 12, 1990)
Epi Quizon (born January 23, 1973)
ER Ejercito (born October 5, 1963)
Eric dela Cruz (born November 20, 1981)
Eric Fructuoso (born March 31, 1976)
Eric Quizon (born January 20, 1967)
Erik Santos (born October 10, 1982)
Ervic Vijandre (born January 26, 1986)

F

Felix Roco (born April 12, 1989)
Fernando Poe Jr. (August 20, 1939–December 14, 2004)
Fernando Poe Sr. (November 27, 1916–October 23, 1951)
Fidel de Castro (April 24, 1911–June 9, 2007)
Francis M. (October 4, 1964–March 6, 2009)
Francis Magundayao (born May 25, 1999)
Franco Hernandez (April 1, 1991–November 11, 2017)
Frank Magalona (born December 19, 1987)
Frank G. Rivera (born February 29, 1948)
Fred Cortes (December 4, 1921–May 23, 1964)
Fred Panopio (February 2, 1939–April 22, 2010)

G

Gab Valenciano (born June 11, 1988))
Gabby Concepcion (born November 5, 1964)
Gabby Eigenmann (born March 2, 1978)
Gabriel de Leon (born September 28, 1992)
Gardo Versoza (born July 8, 1968)
Gary Estrada (born May 16, 1971)
Gary Valenciano (born August 6, 1964)
George Estregan (July 10, 1939–August 8, 1988)
Geoff Eigenmann (born March 23, 1985)
Geoff Taylor (born May 26, 1986)
Gerald Anderson (born March 7, 1989)
Gerald Santos (born May 15, 1991)
Gerardo de León (September 12, 1913–July 25, 1981)
German Moreno (October 4, 1933–January 8, 2016)
Gian Magdangal (born November 18, 1981)
Gian Sotto (born March 18, 1978)
Gil Cuerva (born August 21, 1995)
Gil de León (February 11, 1916–October 15, 1991)
Gio Alvarez (born November 18, 1976)
Gloc-9 (born October 19, 1977)
Grae Fernandez (born November 7, 2001)
Guji Lorenzana (born May 11, 1980)

H

Hajji Alejandro (born December 26, 1954)
Harvey Bautista (born August 16, 2003)
Hayden Kho (born May 20, 1980)
Herbert Bautista (born May 12, 1968)
Hermes Bautista (born February 7, 1986)
Hero Angeles (born December 8, 1984)
Hiro Peralta (born November 7, 1994)
Hubert Webb (born November 7, 1968)

I

Ian Veneracion (born February 7, 1975)
IC Mendoza (born January 14, 1988)
Ice Seguerra (born September 17, 1983)
Ike Lozada (July 5, 1940–March 8, 1995)
Iñigo Pascual (born September 14, 1997)
Ion Perez (born November 27, 1990)
Ishmael Bernal (September 30, 1938–June 2, 1996)
Isko Moreno (born October 24, 1974)
Ivan Dorschner (born September 21, 1990)
Izzy Canillo (born March 3, 2004)

J

Jace Flores (born November 15, 1988)
Jacob Rica (born November 28, 2000)
Jaime Ayala (born May 24, 1962)
Jaime dela Rosa (September 18, 1921 – December 2, 1992)
Jaime Fabregas (born February 28, 1950)
Jairus Aquino (born April 1, 1999)
Jak Roberto (born December 2, 1993)
Jake Cuenca (born December 30, 1987)
Jake Ejercito (born March 27, 1990)
Jake Roxas (born July 13, 1977)
Jake Vargas (born July 9, 1992)
Jake Zyrus (born May 10, 1992)
James Blanco (born June 15, 1981)
James Reid (born May 11, 1993)
James Teng (born February 3, 1998)
James Wright (born 1992)
James Yap (born February 15, 1982)
Jameson Blake (born June 17, 1997)
Jan Manual (born January 13, 1986)
Jan Nieto (born June 13, 1981)
Janno Gibbs (born September 16, 1969)
Janus del Prado (born November 19, 1984)
Jao Mapa (born February 11, 1976)
Japoy Lizardo (born June 8, 1986)
Jason Abalos (born January 14, 1985)
Jason Dy (born June 19, 1990)
Jason Francisco (born October 11, 1987)
Jay Arcilla (born May 26, 1996)
Jay Durias (born August 26, 1975)
Jay Ilagan (January 20, 1952–February 4, 1992)
Jay Manalo (born January 31, 1973)
Jaypee de Guzman (born April 20, 1978)
Jay-R Siaboc (born January 21, 1987)
Jay-R Sillona (born February 1, 1981)
Jayson Gainza (born April 27, 1980)
JC Bonnin (born February 2, 1968)
JC de Vera (born March 10, 1986)
JC Santos (born November 19, 1988)
JC Tiuseco (born April 16, 1985)
Jerald Napoles (born March 2, 1983)
Jeremiah Lisbo (born November 27, 1997)
Jeric Gonzales (born August 7, 1992)
Jeric Teng (born March 18, 1991)
Jericho Rosales (born September 21, 1979)
Jerome Ponce (born June 4, 1995)
Jeron Teng (born March 21, 1994)
Jess Lapid, Jr. (born March 22, 1962)
Jess Lapid, Sr. (October 5, 1933–July 13, 1968)
Jestoni Alarcon (born January 10, 1964)
Jett Pangan (born June 21, 1968)
Jhong Hilario (born August 11, 1976)
Jim Paredes (born August 30, 1951)
Jim Pebanco (unknown born)
Jimboy Martin (born October 12, 1997)
Jimmy Santos (born October 8, 1951)
Jinggoy Estrada (born February 17, 1963)
Jiro Manio (born May 8, 1992)
JK Labajo (born February 5, 2001)
JM de Guzman (born September 9, 1988)
Joaquin Domagoso (born October 24, 2001)
Joel Torre (born June 19, 1961)
Joem Bascon (born August 29, 1986)
Joey de Leon (born October 14, 1946)
Joey Marquez (born October 7, 1957)
Joey Paras (born February 7, 1978)
Johan Santos (born June 1, 1987)
John Apacible (January 22, 1973–March 20, 2011)
John Arcilla (born June 24, 1966)
John Estrada (born June 13, 1973)
John Feir (born December 26, 1986)
John Lapus (born July 7, 1973)
John Lloyd Cruz (born June 24, 1983)
John Manalo (born September 6, 1995)
John Medina (born September 5, 1985)
John Prats (born February 14, 1984)
John Regala (born May 28, 1965)
John Wayne Sace (born May 9, 1989)
John James Uy (born September 13, 1987)
Johnny Delgado (February 28, 1948–November 19, 2009)
Johnny Manahan (born February 11, 1947)
Jojo Alejar (born June 19, 1966)
Joko Diaz (born April 26, 1968)
Jolo Revilla (born March 15, 1988)
Jomari Yllana (born August 16, 1976)
Jon Avila (born September 1, 1985)
Jon Gutierrez (born October 6, 1995)
Jon Hernandez (October 9, 1969–November 11, 2007)
Jon Lucas (born August 18, 1995)
Jon Timmons (born February 21, 1991)
Joonee Gamboa (born August 7, 1936)
Joross Gamboa (born November 28, 1984)
Jose de Villa (February 4, 1924–July 12, 1990)
Jose Manalo (born February 12, 1966)
Jose Padilla Jr. (July 16, 1911–June 18, 1979)
Jose Javier Reyes (born October 21, 1954)
Josef Elizalde (born May 28, 1990)
Joseph Bitangcol (born March 28, 1984)
Joseph Ejercito Estrada (born April 19, 1937)
Joseph Marco (born October 4, 1988)
Josh Santana (born June 18, 1983)
Joshua Dionisio (born December 14, 1994)
Joshua Garcia (born October 7, 1997)
Jovit Baldivino (born October 16, 1993–December 9, 2022)
Juan Rodrigo (born January 9, 1961)
Juancho Trivino (born April 13, 1993)
Julian Estrada (born January 15, 1996)
Julian Trono (born October 2, 1944)
Julio Diaz (born November 18, 1958)
Jun Aristorenas (May 7, 1933–July 18, 2000)
Júnior (September 10, 1943–April 15, 2014)
Junix Inocian (March 17, 1951–June 13, 2015)
Justin Cuyugan (born October 11, 1980)

K

KC Montero (born June 17, 1978)
KD Estrada (born May 3, 2002)
Kean Cipriano (born June 11, 1987)
Keempee de Leon (born January 8, 1973)
Kelvin Miranda (born January 8, 1999)
Ken Alfonso (born February 20, 1990)
Ken Chan (born January 17, 1993)
Kenneth Medrano (born May 9, 1991)
Ketchup Eusebio (born September 9, 1985)
Kevin Santos (born June 15, 1988)
Khalil Ramos (born January 22, 1996)
Kidlat Tahimik (born October 3, 1942)
Kier Legazpi (born January 1, 1973)
Kiko Estrada (born June 4, 1994)
Kim Atienza (born January 24, 1967)
Kim Last (born January 20, 1997)
King Girado (born April 14, 1979)
Kokoy de Santos (born May 15, 1998)
Kris Lawrence (born September 1, 1985)
Kristofer Martin (born November 20, 1994)
Kurt Perez (born December 1, 1997)
Kyle Alandy Amor (unknown born)
Kyle Echarri (born June 20, 2003)

L

LA Lopez (born June 1, 1985)
Lance Busa (born December 16, 1994)
Lance Lucido (born February 27, 2007)
Lance Serrano (born May 22, 1990)
Larry Silva (October 21, 1937–April 27, 2004)
Lauro Delgado (December 10, 1932–January 15, 1978)
Leandro Muñoz (born March 25, 1976)
Leo Martinez (born March 7, 1945)
Lester Llansang (born July 3, 1985)
Lito Calzado (January 20, 1946–November 11, 2011)
Lito Camo (born March 12, 1972)
Lito Lapid (born October 25, 1955)
Lito Legazpi (September 10, 1941–September 8, 2019)
Lito Pimentel (born May 27, 1963)
Lloyd Samartino (born February 2, 1960)
Lloyd Zaragoza (born November 1, 1982)
Lou Salvador (July 7, 1905–March 1, 1973)
Lou Salvador Jr. (December 4, 1940–April 19, 2008)
Lou Veloso (born January 7, 1948)
Louise Abuel (born December 27, 2003)
Lucho Ayala (born March 28, 1992)
Luis Alandy (born February 7, 1980)
Luis Gonzales (June 21, 1928–March 15, 2012)
Luis Manzano (born April 21, 1981)

M

Manny Pacquiao (born December 17, 1978)
Manuel Barbeyto (March 20, 1902–July 24, 1994)
Manuel Chua (born October 29, 1980)
Marc Abaya (born November 6, 1979)
Marc Justine Alvarez (born March 18, 2005)
Marc Nelson (born February 14, 1972)
Marco Alcaraz (born July 12, 1983)
Marco Gumabao (born August 14, 1994)
Marco Sison (born July 10, 1957)
Marcus Adoro (born December 31, 1971)
Mario Barri (born September 17, 1928–November 25, 1971)
Mario Montenegro (July 25, 1928–August 27, 1988)
Mark Bautista (born August 10, 1983)
Mark Anthony Fernandez (born January 18, 1979)
Mark Gil (September 25, 1961–September 1, 2014)
Mark Herras (born December 14, 1986)
Mark Lapid (born February 16, 1980)
Mark Joseph Sarzuelo (August 4, 1957–December 21, 2020)
Markus Paterson (born June 30, 1998)
Marky Cielo (May 12, 1988–December 7, 2008)
Marlo Mortel (born January 4, 1993)
Mart Escudero (born April 11, 1990)
Martin del Rosario (born August 21, 1974)
Martin Nievera (born Fevruary 5, 1962)
Marvin Agustin (born January 29, 1979)
Mat Ranillo III (born October 5, 1956)
Matt Evans (born October 22, 1988)
Matteo Guidicelli (born March 26, 1990)
Max Alvarado (February 19, 1929–April 6, 1997)
Max Soliven (born September 4, 1929–November 24, 2006)
McCoy de Leon (born February 20, 1995)
Mcoy Fundales (born November 3, 1977)
Mel Martinez (born November 13, 1974)
Menggie Cobarrubias (August 10, 1953–March 26, 2020)
Michael de Mesa (born May 24, 1960)
Michael Roy Jornales (born March 16, 1984)
Michael Christian Martinez (born November 4, 1996)
Michael Pangilinan (born November 27, 1995)
Michael V. (born December 17, 1969)
Mico Palanca (February 3, 1978–December 9, 2019)
Miggs Cuaderno (born August 8, 2004)
Miggy Tolentino (born April 20, 1996)
Migo Adecer (born December 20, 1999)
Miguel Rodriguez (November 5, 1954 – February 14, 2005)
Miguel Tanfelix (born September 21, 1998)
Mikael Daez (born January 6, 1988)
Mike de Leon (born May 24, 1947)
Mike Tan (born December 31, 1986)
Mikee Lee (born January 19, 1990)
Mikey Arroyo (born April 26, 1969)
Mikey Bustos (born June 23, 1981)
Miko Manguba (born April 24, 1994)
Miko Sotto (May 10, 1982–December 29, 2010)
Mikoy Morales (born December 11, 1993)
Minióng Álvarez (October 15, 1917–June 23, 1983)
Mister Fu (born June 8, 1978)
Mitoy Yonting (born January 5, 1970)
Mo Twister (born October 19, 1977)
Mon Confiado (born March 19, 1966)
Monsour del Rosario (born May 11, 1965)

N

Napoleon Abueva (January 26, 1930– February 16, 2018)
Nar Cabico (born September 16, 1990)
Narding Anzures (November 10, 1928–March 14, 1989)
Nash Aguas (born October 10, 1998)
Nathan Lopez (born August 19, 1991)
Nathaniel Cruz (Mang Tani) (born February 22, 1960)
Negi (unknown born)
Neil Coleta (born August 4, 1991)
Neil Perez (born July 26, 1985)
Neil Ryan Sese (born April 26, 1979)
Nemesio E. Caravana (April 10, 1901–September 29, 1982)
Neri Colmenares (born December 4, 1959)
Nesthy Petecio (born April 11, 1992)
Nestor de Villa (July 6, 1928–February 21, 2004)
Ney Dimaculangan (born December 15, 1981)
Nicanor Abelardo (February 7, 1893–March 21, 1934)
Nicanor Faeldon (born July 29, 1965)
Nico Antonio (born May 25, 1983)
Nigel Paul Villarete (born September 18, 1962)
Nikko Natividad (born February 13, 1993)
Nino Alejandro (born July 26, 1974)
Niño Muhlach (born October 27, 1971)
Noel Cabangon (born December 25, 1963)
Noel Comia Jr. (born May 29, 2004)
Noel Rosal (born January 2, 1964)
Noli Eala (born April 1, 1969)
Nonie Buencamino (born November 28, 1966)
Nonito Donaire (born November 16, 1982)
Nonong Ballinan (born March 3, 1987)
Nonoy Zuñiga (born May 4, 1953)
Noven Belleza (born November 26, 1994)
Nur Misuari (born March 3, 1939)
Nyoy Volante (born January 25, 1978)

O

Ogie Alcasid (born August 27, 1967)
Ogie Diaz (born January 2, 1970)
OJ Mariano (born February 20, 1981)
Onemig Bondoc (born May 11, 1977)
Onyok Pineda (born October 1, 2010)
Onyok Velasco (born January 10, 1974)
Orestes Ojeda (January 3, 1956−July 27, 2021)
Orlando Nadres (November 6, 1938–July 14, 1991)
Orlando Quevedo (born March 11, 1939)
Orly Mercado (born April 26, 1946)
Oscar Albayalde (born April 26, 1946)
Oscar Malapitan (born June 14, 1955)
Oscar Moreno (born February 28, 1951)
Oscar Obligacion (January 21, 1924–February 2, 2010)
Oscar Yatco (November 23, 1930–July 1, 2014)
Oyo Boy Sotto (born January 12, 1984)

P

Pablo S. Gomez (January 25, 1929–December 26, 2010)
Paciano Rizal (March 9, 1851–April 13, 1930)
Paco Román (October 4, 1869–June 5, 1899)
Paeng Nepomuceno (born January 30, 1957)
Palito (September 4, 1933–April 12, 2010)
Panchito Alba (February 5, 1925–December 18, 1995)
Pancho Magalona (anuary 22, 1922–April 7, 1998)
Pancho Magno (born October 2, 1986)
Pantaleon Alvarez (born January 10, 1958)
Paolo Ballesteros (born November 29, 1982)
Paolo Bediones (born March 17, 1974)
Paolo Contis (born March 14, 1984)
Paolo Duterte (born March 24, 1975)
Paolo Montalban (born May 21, 1973)
Paolo Onesa (born October 12, 1993)
Paolo Serrano (born August 17, 1987)
Papa Jack (born September 8, 1982)
Paquito Diaz (May 28, 1937–March 3, 2011)
Patrick Garcia (born September 14, 1981)
Paul Artadi (born May 5, 1981)
Paul Salas (born April 16, 1998)
Paulo Angeles (born October 27, 1997)
Paulo Avelino (born May 13, 1988)
Pedro Paterno (February 27, 1857–April 26, 1911)
Pedro Abad Santos (January 31, 1876–December 15, 1945)
Pekto (born June 14, 1973)
Pen Medina (born August 27, 1950)
Pepe Diokno (born August 13, 1987)
Pepe Pimentel (April 30, 1929–January 25, 2013)
Peque Gallaga (August 25, 1943–May 7, 2020)
Peter Gabriel Magnaye (born April 9, 1992)
Peter Musñgi (born September 12, 1945)
Petite (unknown born)
Philip Joper Escueta (born August 23, 1993)
Philip Salvador (born August 22, 1953)
Phytos Ramirez (born July 18, 1995)
Pidi Barzaga (born March 25, 1950)
Ping Lacson (born June 1, 1948)
Ping Medina (born July 23, 1983)
Pío del Pilar (July 11, 1860–June 21, 1931)
Piolo Pascual (born January 12, 1977)
Polo Ravales (born June 27, 1982)
Pooh (born December 15, 1974)
Prince Stefan (born February 13, 1989)
Prince Villanueva (born August 21, 1998)
Prospero Luna (April 20, 1934–July 23, 2010)
Prospero Nograles (October 30, 1947–May 4, 2019)
Prospero Pitchay, Jr. (born June 20, 1950)
Pugo (July 12, 1910–December 12, 1978)

Q

Quintín Paredes (September 9, 1884–January 30, 1973)

R

Rafael Rosell (born November 10, 1982)
Raffy Tima (born January 7, 1973)
Raffy Tulfo (born March 14, 1960)
Raikko Mateo (born July 14, 2008)
Raimund Marasigan (born May 22, 1971)
Rainier Castillo (born October 21, 1985)
Ralph Recto (born January 11, 1964)
Ram Chaves (born December 16, 1983)
Ram Revilla (February 12, 1988–October 29, 2011)
Ramil Hernandez (born July 26, 1972)
Ramil Rodriguez (August 22, 1944–April 29, 2014)
Ramon Ang (born January 14, 1954)
Ramon Aquino (August 31, 1917–March 31, 1993)
Ramon Bagatsing (August 19, 1916–February 14, 2006)
Ramon Bagatsing, Jr. (born January 25, 1950)
Ramon Barba (August 31, 1939–October 10, 2021)
Ramon Bautista (born May 20, 1985)
Ramon d'Salva (October 18, 1921–March 1, 2015)
Ramon Jacinto (born June 3, 1945)
Ramon Lopez (unknown born)
Ramon Magsaysay (August 31, 1907–March 17, 1957)
Ramon Magsaysay, Jr. (born June 5, 1938)
Ramon Obusan (June 16, 1938–December 21, 2006)
Ramon Revilla, Sr. (June 16, 1938–December 21, 2006)
Ramon Zamora (June 27, 1935–August 26, 2007)
Randy Santiago (born November 26, 1960)
Raneo Abu (born October 28, 1970)
Ranz Kyle (born May 6, 1997)
Raoul Aragon (unknown born)
Raul Roco (October 26, 1941–August 5, 2005)
Raymart Santiago (born July 20, 1973)
Raymond Bagatsing (born September 15, 1967)
Raymond Gutierrez (born January 21, 1984)
Raymond Lauchengco (born November 29, 1964)
Rayver Cruz (born July 20, 1989)
Redford White (December 5, 1955–July 25, 2010)
Renato Corona (October 15, 1948–April 29, 2016)
Renato Constantino (March 10, 1919–September 15, 1999)
Renato de Villa (born July 20, 1935)
Renato del Prado (March 17, 1940–November 1, 2013)
Rene Hawkins (March 28, 1944–May 10, 2014)
Rene Requiestas (January 23, 1957–July 24, 1993)
Rene Saguisag (born August 14, 1939)
Renz Fernandez (born September 8, 1985)
Renz Valerio (born November 10, 1998)
Rex Gatchalian (born January 21, 1979)
Rey "PJ" Abellana (born September 2, 1962)
Rey Langit (born September 20, 1948)
Rey Malonzo (unknown born)
Rey Nambatac (born January 27, 1994)
Rey Valera (born May 4, 1954)
Reynaldo Dante (March 13, 1912–February 10, 1985)
Rez Cortez (born January 4, 1956)
Rhap Salazar (born February 3, 1997)
Rhene Imperial (born February 15, 1950)
Ric Bustamante (January 26, 1923–May 29, 1995)
Ric Segreto (September 27, 1952–September 6, 1998)
Ricardo Brillantes (March 28, 1912–November 12, 1961)
Ricardo de Ungria (born May 29, 1951)
Ricci Rivero (born May 25, 1998)
Richard Gomez (born April 7, 1966)
Richard Gordon (born August 5, 1945)
Richard Gutierrez (born January 22, 1984)
Richard Juan (born August 2, 1992)
Richard Poon (born December 8, 1973)
Richard Yap (born May 18, 1967)
Ricky Belmonte (December 24, 1947–October 3, 2001)
Ricky Carandang (born September 2, 1967)
Ricky Davao (born March 23, 1961)
Ricky Lee (born March 19, 1948)
Ricky Lo (April 21, 1946–May 4, 2021)
Ricky Reyes (born April 12, 1950)
Rico Barrera (born December 29, 1984)
Rico Blanco (born March 17, 1973)
Rico Hizon (born March 24, 1966)
Rico J. Puno (February 13, 1953–October 30, 2018)
Rico Robles (unknown born)
Rico Yan (March 14, 1974–March 29, 2002)
Ritche Lago Bautista (born June 14, 1977)
RJ Jimenez (born September 17, 1983)
RJ Nieto (born January 26, 1985)
RJ Padilla (born January 22, 1989)
RJ Rosales (March 4, 1974–December 4, 2011)
RK Bagatsing (born May 9, 1988)
Robert Arevalo (born May 6, 1938)
Robert Bolick (born September 13, 1995)
Robert Campos (February 18, 1940–July 8, 2015)
Robert Jaworski (born March 8, 1946)
Roberto Pagdanganan (born July 19, 1946)
Robby Navarro (born September 17, 1979)
Robi Domingo (born September 27, 1989)
Robin Aristorenas (born April 11, 1964)
Robin Padilla (born November 23, 1969)
Rocco Nacino (born March 23, 1987)
Rod Navarro (March 10, 1930 – April 13, 2005)
Rodante Marcoleta (born July 29, 1953)
Rodel Batocabe (April 25, 1966–December 22, 2018)
Rodel Naval (February 16, 1953–June 11, 1995)
Rodel Tapaya (born July 10, 1980)
Roderick Paulate (born April 4, 1960)
Rodil Zalameda (born August 2, 1963)
Rodjun Cruz (born October 10, 1987)
Rodolfo Biazon (born April 14, 1935)
Rodrigo Duterte (born March 28, 1945)
Roel Cortez (July 30, 1967–April 1, 2015)
Rogelio dela Rosa (November 12, 1916–November 26, 1986)
Roger Pogoy (born June 16, 1992)
Roi Vinzon (born September 20, 1953)
Roland Dantes (June 15, 1940–March 16, 2009)
Rolando Uy (born July 5, 1954)
Roldan Aquino (May 2, 1942–March 10, 2014)
Roman Romulo (born February 28, 1967)
Romeo Vasquez (April 9, 1939–May 2, 2017)
Rommel Padilla (born January 5, 1965)
Romnick Sarmenta (born April 28, 1972)
Romy Diaz (November 28, 1940–May 10, 2005)
Ron Henley (born May 20, 1987)
Ronald "Bato" dela Rosa (born January 22, 1962)
Ronald Humarang (born May 16, 1994)
Ronaldo Aquino (December 5, 1961–March 8, 2021)
Ronaldo Valdez (born November 27, 1947)
Ronnel Rivera (born September 1, 1971)
Ronnie Alonte (born October 26, 1996)
Ronnie Lazaro (born November 14, 1957)
Ronnie Liang (born January 31, 1984)
Ronnie Ricketts (born May 26, 1965)
Ross Rival (October 7, 1945–November 16, 2007)
Roy Alvarez (March 23, 1950–February 11, 2014)
Roy Cimatu (born July 4, 1946)
Roy Padilla, Sr. (March 4, 1926–January 17, 1988)
Roy Rodrigo (born March 14, 1974)
RR Herrera (unknown born)
Ruben Padilla (born January 5, 2001)
Ruben Rustia (July 25, 1923–April 7, 1994)
Ruben Tagalog (October 18, 1922–March 5, 1985)
Rudy Concepcion (January 29, 1912–September 19, 1960)
Rudy "Daboy" Fernandez (March 3, 1952–June 7, 2008)
Rudy Hatfield (born September 13, 1977)
Ruel Vernal (born September 8, 1946)
Ruffy Biazon (born March 20, 1969)
Rufus Rodriguez (born September 13, 1953)
Ruru Madrid (born December 4, 1997)
Ryan Agoncillo (born April 10, 1979)
Ryan Bang (born June 16, 1991)
Ryan Cayabyab (born May 4, 1946)
Ryan Eigenmann (born October 3, 1978)
Ryan Ramos (born November 5, 1985)
Ryan Rems (born November 3, 1978)

S

Sabino Vengco, Jr., H.P. (March 9, 1942–May 17, 2021)
Salvador Laurel (November 18, 1928–January 27, 2004)
Salvador Panelo (born September 23, 1946)
Sam Concepcion (born October 17, 1992)
Sam Mangubat (born December 21, 1990)
Sam Milby (born May 23, 1984)
Sam Y.G. (born August 18, 1984)
Samuel Co (born November 15, 1963)
Sandino Martin (born October 12, 1991)
Sandro Marcos (born March 7, 1994)
Satur Ocampo (born April 7, 1939)
Sebastian Duterte (born November 3, 1987)
Sef Cadayona (born March 3, 1989)
Sergio Garcia (born April 10, 1990)
Sergio Osmeña (September 9, 1878–October 19, 1961)
Sergio Osmeña, Jr. (December 4, 1916–March 26, 1984)
Seth Fedelin (born July 9, 2002)
Shalala (January 20, 1960–June 23, 2021)
Shanti Dope (born April 15, 2001)
Sid Lucero (born March 12, 1981)
Silvestre Bello III (born June 23, 1944)
Simon Ibarra (born January 24, 1968)
Slater Young (born December 19, 1987)
Snaffu Rigor (August 8, 1946–August 3, 2016)
Socrates Villegas (born September 28, 1960)
Sonny Angara (born August 7, 1972)
Sonny Parsons (August 22, 1958–May 10, 2020)
Soxie Topacio (June 19, 1952–July 21, 2017)
Spanky Manikan (March 22, 1942–January 14, 2018)
Steven Silva (born 1986)
Subas Herrero (April 3, 1943–March 14, 2013)
Super Tekla (born January 13, 1982)

T

Tado Jimenez (March 24, 1974–February 7, 2014)
Ted Failon (born March 29, 1962)
Teodoro Agoncillo (November 9, 1912–January 14, 1985)
Teddy Baguilat (born July 30, 1966)
Teddy Benavídez (unknown born)
Teddy Casiño (born November 15, 1968)
Teddy Corpuz (born December 4, 1978)
Teddy Locsin, Jr. (born November 15, 1948)
Teejay Marquez (born September 29, 1987)
Teody Belarmino (May 18, 1922–January 22, 1984)
Teofisto Guingona, Jr. (born July 4, 1928)
Teofisto Guingona, Sr. (September 20, 1883–April 11, 1963)
Terence Baylon (born April 26, 1984)
Terrence Romeo (born March 16, 1992)
TG Guingona (born April 19, 1959)
Thirdy Ravena (born December 17, 1996)
Thor Dulay (born December 2, 1980)
Thou Reyes (born March 28, 1985)
Tim Yap (born January 17, 1977)
Timmy Chipeco (born April 6, 1975)
Tino de Lara (August 1, 1917–September 30, 1998)
Tirso Cruz III (born April 1, 1952)
Tito Arevalo (March 29, 1911–December 4, 2000)
Tito Sotto (born August 24, 1948)
TJ Trinidad (born January 22, 1976)
Toby Tiangco (born November 21, 1967)
Togo (November 30, 1905–November 3, 1952)
Tom Olivar (born April 26, 1963)
Tom Rodriguez (born October 1, 1987)
Tomás Mascardo (October 9, 1871–July 7, 1932)
Tomas Osmeña (born July 26, 1948)
Tommy Abuel (born September 16, 1942)
Tommy Esguerra (born June 5, 1994)
Tonton Gutierrez (born September 11, 1964)
Tony Tan Caktiong (born January 5, 1953)
Tony Calvento (February 1, 1953–October 9, 2017)
Tony Dantes (April 11, 1930–June 30, 2005)
Tony Ferrer (June 12, 1934–January 23, 2021)
Tony Labrusca (born August 7, 1995)
Tony Meloto (born January 17, 1950)
Tony Santos, Sr. (April 10, 1920—February 7, 1988)
Tony Velasquez (unknown born)
Topel Lee (unknown born)
Tristan Ramirez (born January 19, 1993)
Troy del Rosario (born January 20, 1992)
Troy Montero (born July 30, 1977)
Tyron Perez (September 14, 1985–December 29, 2011)

V

Val Sotto (born March 23, 1945)
Vandolph Quizon (born May 8, 1984)
Vhong Navarro (born January 4, 1977)
Vic Diaz (July 29, 1932–September 15, 2006)
Vic Silayan (January 31, 1929–August 30, 1987)
Vic Sotto (born April 28, 1954)
Vic Vargas (March 28, 1939–July 19, 2003)
Vice Ganda (born March 31, 1976)
Victor Basa (born June 6, 1985)
Victor Neri (born February 18, 1976)
Victor Silayan (born August 6, 1992)
Victor Wood (February 1, 1946–April 23, 2021)
Vin Abrenica (born May 27, 1991)
Vince Gamad (born January 15, 1994)

W

Wally Bayola (born May 3, 1972)
Wendell Ramos (born August 18, 1978)
Weng Weng (September 7, 1957–August 29, 1994)
Wil Dasovich (born August 26, 1991)
Wilbert Ross (born June 17, 1997)
Will Devaughn (born February 27, 1982)
William Martinez (born 1966)
Willie Revillame (born January 27, 1963)
Wowie de Guzman (born September 22, 1976)

X

Xian Lim (born July 12, 1989)

Y

Yamyam Gucong (born December 8, 1993)
Yasser Marta (born July 28, 1996)
Yong Gopez (born October 24, 1992)
Young JV (born July 23, 1990)
Yoyoy Villame (November 18, 1932–May 18, 2007)
Yuan Francisco (born February 11, 2010)
Yul Servo (born February 21, 1978)
Yves Flores (born November 26, 1994)

Z

Zaijian Jaranilla (born August 23, 2001)
Zaldy Zshornack (December 30, 1937–November 18, 2002)
Zanjoe Marudo (born July 22, 1982)
Zoren Legazpi (born January 31, 1972)
Zymic Jaranilla (born May 20, 2004)

See also
 List of current child actors from the Philippines
 List of former child actors from the Philippines

 
Actors
Filipino
male
Filipino